Koroška Vas na Pohorju is a settlement in the foothills of the Pohorje range in the Municipality of Zreče in northeastern Slovenia. It is part of the traditional region of Styria and is now included with the rest of the municipality in the Savinja Statistical Region.

Name
The name Koroška vas na Pohorju literally means 'Carinthian village in Pohorje'. The name refers to a settlement that was colonized by arrivals from Carinthia in the Middle Ages. Until 1998, the name was simply Koroška vas. See also Koroška Vas and Koroška Bela for similar names outside Carinthia.

References

External links
Koroška Vas na Pohorju at Geopedia

Populated places in the Municipality of Zreče